Kenneth Andrew Kranz (September 12, 1923 – April 8, 2017) was an American NFL football player.

Early life
Born in Milwaukee, Wisconsin, Kranz graduated from Custer High School. He played soccer in his freshman year; then football as a center before being switched to halfback for his junior year. He was all-city during his senior year.

College
Kranz began playing football for the Milwaukee State Teachers College (currently known as the University of Wisconsin–Milwaukee), but was drafted into military service during World War II. He was with the Air Force's troop carrier command in England as a radio operator on aircraft that carried troops into combat zones in France, Belgium and Germany. He earned five battle stars and several medals during his service.

Returning to college, Kranz played football for four years from 1945 to 1948 at the Milwaukee State Teachers College. Earning four collegiate letters in football, he also earned three letters in track claiming the conference discus title in 1946. At the age of 26, he became the first UWM player to be drafted to a professional football team.

Pro-Football
The Green Bay Packers selected Kranz in the 21st round of the 1949 NFL Draft. Kranz played defensive back for the Packers in six or seven games of the 1949 season from April 10, 1949, until the end of the season. At that time he decided on leaving the team to return to school after discussing it with his wife, Shirley. He earned $3,500 for the season.

Teaching and later life
Kranz taught for 32 years at Browning Elementary School of Milwaukee Public Schools, then retired in 1984. He was inducted into the Milwaukee Athletics Hall of Fame in 1975. Kranz died in April 2017 at the age of 93.

See also
Green Bay Packers players

References

1923 births
2017 deaths
People from Waukesha County, Wisconsin
Players of American football from Milwaukee
American football defensive backs
Milwaukee Panthers football players
Green Bay Packers players
University of Wisconsin–Milwaukee alumni
Educators from Wisconsin